Kalyan is a village of Kasur, District in the Punjab province of Pakistan. It is located to the south of the capital Lahore with an altitude of 208 metres.

References

Villages in Lahore District